Island Lake Airport or Island Lake - Garden Hill Airport  is located  southwest of Island Lake, Manitoba, Canada.

Airlines and destinations

Location & QuickFacts

References

External links

Certified airports in Manitoba